The 1989–90 NCAA Division I men's basketball rankings was made up of two human polls, the AP Poll and the Coaches Poll, in addition to various other preseason polls.

Legend

AP Poll 
The AP poll expanded to 25 teams beginning with the 1989–90 season.

Coaches Poll

References 

1989-90 NCAA Division I men's basketball rankings
College men's basketball rankings in the United States